American Chinese cuisine is a cuisine derived from Chinese cuisine that was developed by Chinese Americans. The dishes served in many North American Chinese restaurants are adapted to American tastes and often differ significantly from those found in China.

History 

Chinese immigrants arrived in the United States seeking employment as miners and railroad workers. As larger groups arrived, laws were put in place preventing them from owning land. They mostly lived together in ghettos, individually referred to as "Chinatown". Here the immigrants started their own small businesses, including restaurants and laundry services.

By the 19th century, the Chinese community in San Francisco operated sophisticated and sometimes luxurious restaurants patronized mainly by Chinese. The restaurants in smaller towns (mostly owned by Chinese immigrants) served food based on what their customers requested, anything ranging from pork chop sandwiches and apple pie, to beans and eggs. Many of these small-town restaurant owners were self-taught family cooks who improvised on different cooking methods using whatever ingredients were available.

These smaller restaurants were responsible for developing American Chinese cuisine, where the food was modified to suit a more American palate. First catering to miners and railroad workers, they established new eateries in towns where Chinese food was completely unknown, adapting local ingredients and catering to their customers' tastes. Even though the new flavors and dishes meant they were not strictly Chinese cuisine, these Chinese restaurants have been cultural ambassadors to Americans.

Chinese restaurants in the United States began during the California Gold Rush (1848–1855), which brought 20,000–30,000 immigrants across from the Canton (Guangdong) region of China. The first Chinese restaurant in America is debated. Some say it was Macau and Woosung, while others cite Canton Restaurant. Both unphotographed establishments were founded in 1849 in San Francisco. Either way, these and other such restaurants were central features in the daily lives of immigrants. They provided a connection to home, particularly for the many bachelors who did not have the resources or knowledge to cook for themselves. In 1852, the ratio of male to female Chinese immigrants was a 18:1. These restaurants served as gathering places and cultural centers for the Chinese community. By 1850, there were five Chinese  restaurants in San Francisco. Soon after, significant amounts of food were being imported from China to America's west coast.

The trend spread steadily eastward with the growth of the American railways, particularly to New York City.  The Chinese Exclusion Act allowed merchants to enter the country, and in 1915, restaurant owners became eligible for merchant visas. This fueled the opening of Chinese restaurants as an immigration vehicle. Pekin Noodle Parlor, established in 1911, is the oldest operating Chinese restaurant in the country. , the United States had 46,700 Chinese restaurants.

Along the way, cooks adapted southern Chinese dishes and developed a style of Chinese food not found in China, such as chop suey. Restaurants (along with Chinese laundries) provided an ethnic niche for small businesses at a time when Chinese people were excluded from most jobs in the wage economy by ethnic discrimination or lack of language fluency. By the 1920s, this cuisine, particularly chop suey, became popular among middle-class Americans. However, after World War II it began to be dismissed for not being "authentic", though it continued to be popular.

Late 20th-century tastes have been more accommodating. By this time, it had become evident that Chinese restaurants no longer catered mainly to Chinese customers. Chinese-American restaurants played a key role in ushering in the era of take-out and delivery food in the United States.

In New York City, delivery was pioneered in the 1970s by Empire Szechuan Gourmet Franchise, which hired Taiwanese students studying at Columbia University to do the work. Chinese American restaurants were among the first restaurants to use picture menus in the US.

Beginning in the 1950s, Taiwanese immigrants replaced Cantonese immigrants as the primary labor force in American Chinese restaurants. These immigrants expanded American-Chinese cuisine beyond Cantonese cuisine to encompass dishes from many different regions of China as well as Japanese-inspired dishes.

In 1955, the Republic of China evacuated the Dachen Islands in the face of the encroaching Communists. Many who evacuated to Taiwan later moved to the United States as they lacked strong social networks and access to opportunity in Taiwan. Chefs from the Dachen Islands had a strong influence on American Chinese food.

Taiwanese immigration largely ended in the 1990s due to an economic boom and democratization in Taiwan. From the 1990s onward, immigrants from China once again made up the majority of cooks in American Chinese restaurants. There has been a consequential component of Chinese emigration of illegal origin, most notably Fuzhou people from Fujian Province and Wenzhounese from Zhejiang Province in Mainland China, specifically destined to work in Chinese restaurants in New York City, beginning in the 1980s.

Adapting Chinese cooking techniques to local produce and tastes has led to the development of American Chinese cuisine. Many of the Chinese restaurant menus in the US are printed in Chinatown, Manhattan, which has a strong Chinese-American demographic.

In 2011, the Smithsonian National Museum of American History displayed some of the historical background and cultural artifacts of American Chinese cuisine in its exhibit entitled, Sweet & Sour: A Look at the History of Chinese Food in the United States.

Differences from other regional cuisines in China
American Chinese food builds from styles and food habits brought from the southern province of Guangdong, often from the Toisan district of Toisan, the origin of most Chinese immigration before the closure of immigration from China in 1924. These Chinese families developed new styles and used readily available ingredients, especially in California. The type of Chinese-American cooking served in restaurants was different from the foods eaten in Chinese-American homes.  Of the various regional cuisines in China, Cantonese cuisine has been the most influential in the development of American Chinese food.

One major difference between Chinese and American-Chinese cuisine is in the use of vegetables. Salads containing raw or uncooked ingredients are rare in traditional Chinese cuisine. However, an increasing number of American Chinese restaurants, including some upscale establishments, have started to offer these items in response to customer demand. While cuisine in China makes frequent use of Asian leaf vegetables like bok choy and gai-lan, American Chinese cuisine makes use of some ingredients not native to and very rarely used in China, for example, Western broccoli instead of Chinese broccoli (gai-lan).

Chinese ingredients considered "exotic" in North America have become more available over time, including fresh fruits and vegetables which previously had been hard to find. For example, edible snow pea pods have become widely available, while the less-known dau miu (also called "pea sprouts", "pea pod stems", or "pea shoots") are also appearing on menus, and even in supermarkets in North America.

American-Chinese food also has had a reputation for high levels of MSG to enhance flavor; however, in recent years, market forces and customer demand have encouraged many restaurants to offer "MSG Free" or "No MSG" menus, or to omit this ingredient on request.

Egg fried rice in American Chinese cuisine is also prepared differently, with more soy sauce added for more flavor whereas the traditional egg fried rice uses less soy sauce. Some food styles, such as dim sum, were also modified to fit American palates, such as added batter for fried dishes and extra soy sauce.

Both Chinese and American-Chinese cooking utilize similar methods of preparation, such as stir frying, pan frying, and deep frying, which are all easily done using a wok.

Ming Tsai, the owner of the Blue Ginger restaurant in Wellesley, Massachusetts, and host of PBS culinary show Simply Ming, said that American Chinese restaurants typically try to have food representing 3-5 regions of China at one time, have chop suey, or have "fried vegetables and some protein in a thick sauce", "eight different sweet and sour dishes", or "a whole page of 20 different chow meins or fried rice dishes". Tsai said "Chinese-American cuisine is 'dumbed-down' Chinese food. It's adapted... to be blander, thicker and sweeter for the American public".

Most American Chinese establishments cater to non-Chinese customers with menus written in English or containing pictures. If separate Chinese-language menus are available, they typically feature items such as liver, chicken feet, or other meat dishes that might deter American customers (such as offal).  In Chinatown, Manhattan, some restaurants are known for having a "phantom" menu with food preferred by ethnic Chinese, but believed to be disliked by non-Chinese Americans.

Dishes

Menu items not found in China
Dishes that often appear on American Chinese restaurant menus include:
 Almond chicken — chicken breaded in batter containing ground almonds, fried and served with almonds and onions.
 Beef and broccoli — flank steak cut into small pieces, stir fried with broccoli, and covered in a dark sauce made with soy sauce and oyster sauce and thickened with cornstarch.
 Chicken and broccoli — similar to beef and broccoli, but with chicken instead of beef.
 Chinese chicken salad — usually containing sliced or shredded chicken, uncooked leafy greens, crispy noodles (or fried wonton skins) and sesame dressing. Some restaurants serve the salad with mandarin oranges.
 Chop suey — connotes "assorted pieces" in Chinese. It is usually a mix of vegetables and meat in a brown sauce but can also be served in a white sauce.
 Crab rangoon — fried wonton skins stuffed with (usually) artificial crab meat (surimi) and cream cheese.
 Fortune cookie — invented in California as a Westernized version of the Japanese omikuji senbei, fortune cookies have become sweetened and found their way to many American Chinese restaurants.
 Fried wontons — somewhat similar to crab rangoon, a filling, (most often pork), is wrapped in a wonton skin and deep fried.
 General Tso's chicken — chunks of chicken that are dipped in batter, deep fried, and seasoned with ginger, garlic, sesame oil, scallions, and hot chili peppers. Believed to be named after Qing dynasty statesman and military leader Zuo Zongtang, often referred to as General Tso.
 Mongolian beef — fried beef with scallions or white onions in a spicy and often sweet brown sauce. 
 Pepper steak — sliced steak, green bell peppers, tomatoes, and white or green onions stir fried with salt, sugar, and soy sauce. Bean sprouts are a less common addition.
 Royal beef—deep-fried sliced beef, doused in a wine sauce and often served with steamed broccoli.
 Sesame chicken — boned, marinated, battered, and deep-fried chicken which is then dressed with a translucent red or orange, sweet and mildly spicy sauce, made from soy sauce, corn starch, vinegar, chicken broth, and sugar.

 Sushi — despite being served in the Japanese and American styles, some American Chinese restaurants serve various types of sushi, usually on buffets.
 Sweet roll — yeast rolls, typically fried, covered in granulated sugar or powdered sugar. Some variants are stuffed with cream cheese or icing.
 Wonton strips — these deep-fried strips of dough are commonly offered as complimentary appetizers, along with duck sauce and hot mustard, or with soup when ordering take-out.

Other American Chinese dishes
Dau miu  is a Chinese vegetable that has become popular since the early 1990s, and now not only appears on English-language menus, usually as "pea shoots", but is often served by upscale non-Asian restaurants as well. Originally it was only available during a few months of the year, but it is now grown in greenhouses and is available year-round.

Versions of dishes also found in China

 Beijing beef — in China, this dish uses gai lan (Chinese broccoli) rather than American broccoli.
 Cashew chicken — stir-fried tender chicken pieces with cashew nuts.
 Chow mein — literally means "stir-fried noodles". Chow mein consists of fried crispy noodles with bits of meat and vegetables. It can come with chicken, pork, shrimp or beef.
 Egg foo young — Chinese-style omelet with vegetables and meat, usually served with a brown gravy. While some restaurants in North America deep fry the omelet, versions found in Asia are more likely to fry in the wok.
 Egg roll — while spring rolls have a thin, light beige crispy skin that flakes apart, and is filled with mushrooms, bamboo, and other vegetables inside, the American-style egg roll has a thicker, chewier, dark brown bubbly skin stuffed with cabbage and usually bits of meat or seafood (such as pork or shrimp), but no egg.
 Fried rice — fried-rice dishes are popular offerings in American Chinese food due to the speed and ease of preparation and their appeal to American tastes.
Fried rice is generally prepared with rice cooled overnight, allowing restaurants to put leftover rice to good use (freshly cooked rice is actually less suitable for fried rice).
The Chinese-American version of this dish typically uses more soy sauce than the versions found in China.
Fried rice is offered with different combinations of meat (pork, chicken and shrimp are the most popular) and vegetables.
 Ginger beef — tender beef cut in chunks, mixed with ginger and Chinese mixed vegetables.
 Ginger fried beef — tender beef cut in strings, battered, deep fried, then re-fried in a wok mixed with a sweet sauce, a variation of a popular Northern Chinese dish.
 Hulatang — a traditional Chinese soup with hot spices, often called "spicy soup" on menus.
 Hot and sour soup - The North American soups tend to have starch added as a thickener.
 Kung Pao chicken — a spicy Sichuan dish that is served with peanuts, scallions, and Sichuan peppers. Some versions in North America may include zucchini and bell peppers.
 Lo mein ("stirred noodles") — frequently made with eggs and flour, making them chewier than a recipe simply using water. Thick, spaghetti-shaped noodles are pan fried with vegetables (mainly bok choy and Chinese cabbage or napa) and meat. Sometimes this dish is referred to as chow mein (which literally means "stir-fried noodles" in Cantonese).
 Mei Fun — noodles usually simmered in broth with other ingredients such as fish balls, beef balls, and/or slices of fishcake.
 Moo shu pork — the original version uses more typically Chinese ingredients (including wood ear fungi and daylily buds) and thin flour pancakes, while the American version often uses vegetables more familiar to Americans, and thicker pancakes. This dish is quite popular in Chinese restaurants in the United States, but not as popular in China.
 Orange chicken — chopped, battered, fried chicken with a sweet orange flavored chili sauce that is thickened and glazed. The traditional version consists of stir-fried chicken in a light, slightly sweet soy sauce flavored with dried orange peels.
 Wonton soup — In most American Chinese restaurants, only wonton dumplings in broth are served, while versions found in China may come with noodles. (In Canton, it can be a full meal in itself, consisting of thin egg noodles and several pork and prawn wontons in a pork or chicken soup broth or noodle broth). Especially in takeout restaurants, wonton are often made with thicker dough skins, to withstand the rigors of delivery.

Regional variations

New York City
The New York metropolitan area is home to the largest Chinese population outside of Asia, which also constitutes the largest metropolitan Asian-American group in the United States and the largest Asian-national metropolitan diaspora in the Western Hemisphere. The Chinese-American population of the New York City metropolitan area was an estimated 893,697 as of 2017.

Given the New York metropolitan area's continuing status as by far the leading gateway for Chinese immigrants to the United States, all popular styles of every Chinese regional cuisine have commensurately become ubiquitously accessible in New York City, including Hakka, Taiwanese, Shanghainese, Hunanese, Szechuan, Cantonese, Fujianese, Xinjiang, Zhejiang, and Korean Chinese cuisine. Even the relatively obscure Dongbei style of cuisine indigenous to Northeast China is now available in Flushing, Queens, as well as Mongolian cuisine and Uyghur cuisine.

The availability of regional variations of Chinese cuisine coming from so many provinces of China is most apparent in the city's Chinatowns in Queens, particularly the Flushing Chinatown (法拉盛華埠), but is also notable in the city's Chinatowns in Brooklyn and Manhattan.

Kosher preparation

Kosher preparation of Chinese food is also widely available in New York City, given the metropolitan area's large Jewish and particularly Orthodox Jewish populations.

The perception that American Jews eat at Chinese restaurants on Christmas Day is documented in media. The tradition may have arisen from the lack of other open restaurants on Christmas Day, the close proximity of Jewish and Chinese immigrants to each other in New York City, and the absence of dairy foods combined with meat.

Kosher Chinese food is usually prepared in New York City, as well as in other large cities with Orthodox Jewish neighborhoods, under strict rabbinical supervision as a prerequisite for Kosher certification.

Los Angeles County
Chinese populations in Los Angeles represent at least 21 of the 34 provincial-level administrative units of China, along with the largest population of Taiwanese-born immigrants outside of Taiwan, making greater Los Angeles home to a diverse population of Chinese people in the United States.

Chinese-American cuisine in the Greater Los Angeles area is concentrated in Chinese ethnoburbs rather than traditional Chinatowns. The oldest Chinese ethnoburb is Monterey Park, considered to be the nation's first suburban Chinatown.

Although Chinatown in Los Angeles is still a significant commercial center for Chinese immigrants, the majority are centered in the San Gabriel Valley which is the one of the largest concentration of Asian-Americans in the country, stretching from Monterey Park into the cities of Alhambra, San Gabriel, Rosemead, San Marino, South Pasadena, West Covina, Walnut, City of Industry, Diamond Bar, Arcadia, and Temple City.

The Valley Boulevard corridor is the main artery of Chinese restaurants in the San Gabriel Valley. Another hub with a significant Chinese population is Irvine (Orange County). More than 200,000 Chinese Americans live in the San Gabriel Valley alone, with over 67% being foreign born. The valley has become a brand-name tourist destination in China, although droughts in California are creating a difficult impact upon its water security and existential viability. Of the ten cities in the United States with the highest proportions of Chinese Americans, the top eight are located in the San Gabriel Valley, making it one of the largest concentrated hubs for Chinese Americans in North America.

Some regional styles of Chinese cuisine include Beijing, Chengdu, Chonqing, Dalian, Hangzhou, Hong Kong, Hunan, Mongolian hot pot, Nanjing, Shanghai, Shanxi, Shenyang, Wuxi, Xinjiang, Yunnan, and Wuhan.

San Francisco Bay Area
Since the early 1990s, many American Chinese restaurants influenced by California cuisine have opened in the San Francisco Bay Area. The trademark dishes of American Chinese cuisine remain on the menu, but there is more emphasis on fresh vegetables, and the selection is vegetarian-friendly.

This new cuisine has exotic ingredients like mangos and portobello mushrooms. Brown rice is often offered as an alternative to white rice.

Some restaurants substitute grilled wheat flour tortillas for the rice pancakes in mushu dishes. This occurs even in some restaurants that would not otherwise be identified as California Chinese, both the more Westernized places and the more authentic places. There is a Mexican bakery that supplies some restaurants with thinner tortillas made for use with mushu. Mushu purists do not always react positively to this trend.

In addition, many restaurants serving more native-style Chinese cuisines exist, due to the high numbers and proportion of ethnic Chinese in the San Francisco Bay Area.

Restaurants specializing in Cantonese, Sichuanese, Hunanese, Northern Chinese, Shanghainese, Taiwanese, and Hong Kong traditions are widely available, as are more specialized restaurants such as seafood restaurants, Hong Kong-style diners and cafes, also known as Cha chaan teng, dim sum teahouses, and hot pot restaurants. Many Chinatown areas also feature Chinese bakeries, boba milk tea shops, roasted meat, vegetarian cuisine, and specialized dessert shops.

Chop suey is not widely available in San Francisco, and the area's chow mein is different from Midwestern chow mein.

Boston
Chinese cuisine in Boston results from a combination of economic and regional factors, in association with the wide Chinese academic scene. The growing Boston Chinatown accommodates Chinese-owned bus lines shuttling an increasing number of passengers to and from the numerous Chinatowns in New York City, and this has led to some exchange between Boston Chinese cuisine and that in New York.

A large immigrant Fujianese immigrant population has made a home in Boston, leading to Fuzhou cuisine being readily available there. An increasing Vietnamese population has also had an influence on Chinese cuisine in Greater Boston.

In addition, innovative dishes incorporating chow mein and chop suey as well as locally farmed produce and regionally procured seafood are found in Chinese as well as non-Chinese food in and around Boston. The selection of Chinese bakery products has increased markedly in the 21st century, although the range of choices in New York City remains supreme.

Joyce Chen introduced northern Chinese (Mandarin) and Shanghainese dishes to Boston in the 1950s, including Peking duck, moo shu pork, hot and sour soup, and potstickers, which she called "Peking Ravioli" or "Ravs". Her restaurants would be frequented by early pioneers of the ARPANET, as well as celebrities such as John Kenneth Galbraith, James Beard, Julia Child, Henry Kissinger, Beverly Sills, and Danny Kaye. A former Harvard University president called her eating establishment "not merely a restaurant, but a cultural exchange center". In addition, her single-season PBS national television series Joyce Chen Cooks popularized some dishes which could be made at home, and she often encouraged using substitute ingredients when necessary.

Philadelphia
The evolving American Chinese cuisine scene in Philadelphia has similarities with the situation in both New York City and Boston. As with Boston, Philadelphia is experiencing significant Chinese immigration from New York City,  to the north, and from China, the top country of birth by a significant margin for a new arrivals there .

There is a growing Fujianese community in Philadelphia as well, and Fuzhou cuisine is readily available in the Philadelphia Chinatown. Also, emerging Vietnamese cuisine in Philadelphia is contributing to evolution in local Chinese cuisine, with some Chinese-American restaurants adopting Vietnamese influences or recipes.

Washington, D.C. 
Although Washington, D.C.'s Chinese community has not achieved as high of a local profile as that in other major cities along the Mid-Atlantic United States, it is now growing, and rapidly so, due to the gentrification of DC's Chinatown and the status of Washington, D.C., as the capital of the United States. The growing Chinese community in DC. and its suburbs has revitalized the influence of Chinese cuisine in the area.

Washington, D.C.'s population is 1% Chinese, making them the largest single Asian ancestry in the city. However, the Chinese community in the DC area is no longer solely concentrated in the Chinatown, which is about 15% Chinese and 25% Asian, but is mostly concentrated throughout various towns in suburban Maryland and Virginia. The largest concentration of Chinese and Taiwanese in the DC area is in Rockville, Maryland, in Montgomery county.

In DC proper, there are Chinese-owned restaurants specializing in both Chinese American and authentic Chinese cuisine. Regional variations of Chinese cuisine that restaurants in DC specialize in include Shanghainese cuisine, Cantonese cuisine, Uyghur cuisine, Mongolian cuisine, and Sichuan cuisine. In the suburbs of DC in Maryland and Virginia, many of which have a much higher Chinese population than DC, regional variations present aside from the ones previously mentioned include Hong Kong cuisine, Hunan cuisine, Shaanxi cuisine, Taiwanese cuisine, and Yunnan cuisine.

Puerto Rico

Hawaii
Hawaiian-Chinese food developed somewhat differently from Chinese cuisine in the continental United States.

Owing to the diversity of Pacific ethnicities in Hawaii and the history of the Chinese influence in Hawaii, resident Chinese cuisine forms a component of the cuisine of Hawaii, which is a fusion of different culinary traditions. Some Chinese dishes are typically served as part of plate lunches in Hawaii.

The names of foods are different as well, such as Manapua, from the Hawaiian contraction of "Mea ono pua'a" or "delicious pork item" from the dim sum bao, though the meat is not necessarily pork.

Other regions
 Chow mein sandwich — sandwich of chow mein and gravy (Southeastern Massachusetts and Rhode Island)
 Chop suey sandwich — sandwich of chicken chop suey on a hamburger bun (North Shore of Massachusetts)
 St. Paul sandwich — egg foo young patty in plain white sandwich bread (St. Louis, Missouri)
 Springfield-style cashew chicken — a style of cashew chicken that combines breaded deep-fried chicken, cashew nuts, and oyster sauce (Springfield, Missouri)
 War/wor sue gai (boneless almond chicken) — bite-sized Southern-style fried chicken with yellow sauce (Columbus, Ohio)
 Yaka mein — Chinese-Creole food found in New Orleans that evolved from beef noodle soup

Chain restaurants

 China Coast — closed in 1995; owned by General Mills Corporation, formerly 52 locations throughout the United States
 Chinese Gourmet Express — throughout the United States
 Leeann Chin — Minnesota and North Dakota; owned at one time by General Mills Corp.
 Manchu Wok — throughout the United States and Canada, as well as Guam, Korea and Japan
 Panda Express — throughout North America (including Canada and Mexico), plus locations in Asia and the Middle East
 Pei Wei Asian Diner — throughout the United States; formerly a subsidiary of P.F. Chang's
 P. F. Chang's China Bistro — throughout the United States; featuring California-Chinese fusion cuisine
 Pick Up Stix — California, Arizona, and Nevada
 Stir Crazy — Illinois, Missouri, Wisconsin, Minnesota, New York, Florida, Indiana, Texas, and Ohio

Popular culture
Many American films (for example: The Godfather; Ghostbusters; The Lost Boys; The Naked Gun; Crossing Delancey; Paid in Full; and Inside Out) involve scenes where Chinese take-out food is eaten from oyster pails. A consistent choice of cuisine in all these cases, however, might just be an indicator of its popularity. A running gag in Dallas is Cliff Barnes' fondness for inexpensive Chinese take-out food, as opposed to his nemesis J. R. Ewing frequenting fine restaurants.

Among the numerous American television series and films that feature Chinese restaurants as a setting include  A Christmas Story, Seinfeld (particularly the episode "The Chinese Restaurant"), Sex and the City, Big Trouble in Little China, South Park, Year of the Dragon, Lethal Weapon 4, Mickey Blue Eyes, Booty Call, Rush Hour 2, and Men in Black 3. In most cases, it is not an actual restaurant but a movie set that typifies the stereotypical American Chinese eatery, featuring "paper lanterns and intricate woodwork", with "numerous fish tanks and detailed [red] wallpaper [with gold designs]" and "golden dragons", plus "hanging ducks in the window".

See also

 Fusion cuisine
 Canadian Chinese cuisine
 Australian Chinese cuisine
 Chinese bakery products
 Chinese cuisine
 American cuisine
 British Chinese cuisine
 Indian Chinese cuisine
 Fortune Cookie
 List of Chinese restaurants
 Oyster pail

Citations

References and further reading

Studies
 
 
  Free download:

Cookbooks
 Sara Bosse, Onoto Watanna, with an Introduction by Jacqueline M. Newman. Chinese-Japanese Cook Book. (1914; reprinted, Bedford, MA: Applewood Books,  2006).  . .
 
 Eileen Yin-Fei Lo and Alexandra Grablewski. The Chinese Kitchen: Recipes, Techniques and Ingredients, History, and Memories from America's Leading Authority on Chinese Cooking. (New York: William Morrow, 1999).  .

External links

 "Chinese food in America History" (The Food Timeline) The Food Timeline: history notes--restaurants, chefs & foodservice
 Imogen Lim Restaurant Menu Collection: American menus. Vancouver Island University Library.
 Harley J. Spiller Collection of Chinese Restaurant Menus University of Toronto, Scarborough Library

 
Cuisine
Cuisine
Chinese cuisine
Hawaiian cuisine